Eliot James Martin (born ) is an English former professional footballer. He played for Gillingham between 1991 and 1995, making 60 appearances in the Football League.

References

1972 births
Living people
English footballers
Gillingham F.C. players
Chelmsford City F.C. players
Margate F.C. players
Footballers from Plumstead
Ebbsfleet United F.C. players
Association football defenders